The 1912 Tour de France was the 10th edition of Tour de France, one of cycling's Grand Tours. The Tour began in Paris on 30 June and Stage 9 occurred on 16 July with a flat stage from Perpignan. The race finished in Paris on 28 July.

Stage 9
18 July 1912 — Perpignan to Luchon,

Stage 10
18 July 1912 — Luchon to Bayonne,

Stage 11
20 July 1912 — Bayonne to La Rochelle,

Stage 12
21 July 1912 — La Rochelle to Brest,

Stage 13
24 July 1912 — Brest to Cherbourg-en-Cotentin,

Stage 14
26 July 1912 — Cherbourg-en-Cotentin to Le Havre,

Stage 15
28 July 1912 — Le Havre to Paris,

References

1912 Tour de France
Tour de France stages